Clay's Hope is a historic home in Bellevue, Talbot County, Maryland, United States. It is a -story, 3-bay Flemish bond brick house with the gable roof, built around 1783.  Also standing on the property is an array of outbuildings including the last known tobacco house to survive in Talbot County; a frame structure built around 1800. Other structures include a smokehouse-like frame structure built as an implement storage building and an early-19th-century gable-roofed structure with built-in seats that has been converted into a gazebo. A small Harrison family cemetery is also on the property.

Clay's Hope was listed on the National Register of Historic Places in 1979.

References

External links
, including photo from 1976, at Maryland Historical Trust

Houses in Talbot County, Maryland
Houses on the National Register of Historic Places in Maryland
Houses completed in 1783
National Register of Historic Places in Talbot County, Maryland